Ramnagar Kachari Para is a village in Murshidabad district in the Indian state of West Bengal.

Village details

History
This village was established in 1916. The name came from Kacchari people who formerly inhabited the area around the village.

There is a big playground named Ramnagar Ashrami Club Playground.

Transport
The village is served by several roads including a road to Raninagar and the Indian border.

Schools and governmental organisations
Ramnagar Kachari Para Primary School (Governmental),
Ramnagar Kachari Para Shishu Siksha Kendra  (Governmental),
Vidyasagar Shishu Siksha Laya (Non Governmental)
Ramnagar Kachari Para Anganwari Kendra (Governmental)
There is also a Mini Hospital.

Notable tourist spots
 Kali Mandir
 Durga Mandir
 Ashrami Club
 Shyamapada's Ghat

Neighbouring villages
Ramnagar Natun Para
Ramnagar Sarkar Para
Krishnagar
Bablabona

Language
Bengali
Hindi
English

Population
1479

References

External links
 Facebook page
 Google Maps

Villages in Murshidabad district
Populated places established in 1916